Christian Jensen (4 October 1888 – 16 January 1947) was a Danish weightlifter. He competed in the men's middleweight event at the 1920 Summer Olympics.

References

External links
 

1888 births
1947 deaths
Danish male weightlifters
Olympic weightlifters of Denmark
Weightlifters at the 1920 Summer Olympics
Sportspeople from Aalborg